The 1914 VPI Gobblers football team represented Virginia Agricultural and Mechanical College and Polytechnic Institute in the 1914 college football season. The team was led by their head coach Branch Bocock and finished with a record of six wins, two losses and one tie (6–2–1).

Schedule

Players
The following players were members of the 1914 football team according to the roster published in the 1915 edition of The Bugle, the Virginia Tech yearbook.

Game summaries

King
The starting lineup for VPI was: Taylor (left end), Whitehead (left tackle), Montague (left guard), Savage (center), Benedict (right guard), Caffee (right tackle), Rives (right end), Peake (quarterback), Huddle (left halfback), Davis (right halfback), Sanders (fullback). The substitutes were: Engleby, Harvey, Henderson, Macon, Moore, Robertson, Treakle and Vaughan-Lloyd.

Hampden–Sydney
The starting lineup for VPI was: Rives (left end), Oppenheimer (left tackle), Benedict (left guard), Montague (center), Williams (right guard), Caffee (right tackle), Cottrell (right end), Peake (quarterback), Funkhouser (left halfback), Moore (right halfback), Sanders (fullback). The substitutes were: Davis, Engleby, Gregory, Harvey, Huddle, Macon, Savage, Somerville, Taylor, Treakle and Vaughan-Lloyd.

West Virginia Wesleyan
The starting lineup for VPI was: Taylor (left end), Benedict (left tackle), Oppenheimer (left guard), Savage (center), Treakle (right guard), Caffee (right tackle), Powell (right end), Peake (quarterback), Dixon (left halfback), Moore (right halfback), Sanders (fullback). The substitutes were: Funkhouser, Gregory, Macon, Montague, Rives and Somerville.

Roanoke
The starting lineup for VPI was: Taylor (left end), Moore (left tackle), Benedict (left guard), Montague (center), Treakle (right guard), Caffee (right tackle), Franklin (right end), Peake (quarterback), Dixon (left halfback), Funkhouser (right halfback), Huddle (fullback). The substitutes were: Cottrell, Engleby, Harvey, Macon, Perry, Rives, Sanders, Somerville and Vaughan-Lloyd.

Washington and Lee
The starting lineup for VPI was: Taylor (left end), Caffee (left tackle), Cottrell (left guard), Montague (center), Williams (right guard), Benedict (right tackle), Vaughan-Lloyd (right end), Peake (quarterback), Macon (left halfback), Huddle (right halfback), Sanders (fullback). The substitutes were: Dixon, Engleby, Funkhouser, Graves, Gregory, Oppenheimer and Rives.

Marshall
The starting lineup for VPI was: Taylor (left end), Benedict (left tackle), Moore (left guard), Henderson (center), Treakle (right guard), Caffee (right tackle), Tyree (right end), Terry (quarterback), Davis (left halfback), Funkhouser (right halfback), Sanders (fullback). The substitutes were: Campbell, Cottrell, Dixon, Engleby, Gregory, Harvey, Hill, Huddle, Logan, Macon, Oppenheimer, Rives, Vaughan-Lloyd and Williams.

North Carolina A&M
The starting lineup for VPI was: Rives (left end), A. P. Moore (left tackle), Williams (left guard), Henderson (center), A. B. Moore (right guard), Benedict (right tackle), Franklin (right end), Peake (quarterback), Funkhouser (left halfback), Macon (right halfback), Sanders (fullback). The substitutes were: Dixon, Harvey, Oppenheimer and Terry.

VMI
The starting lineup for VPI was: Taylor (left end), Benedict (left tackle), Moore (left guard), Henderson (center), Williams (right guard), Caffee (right tackle), Franklin (right end), Peake (quarterback), Dixon (left halfback), Funkhouser (right halfback), Sanders (fullback). The substitutes were: Gregory, Harvey, Huddle, Macon, Rives and Terry.

References

VPI
Virginia Tech Hokies football seasons
VPI Gobblers football